The 2022 World Athletics U20 Championships, also known colloquially by its former official title, the World Junior Championships, was an international athletics competition for athletes qualifying as juniors (born no earlier than 1 January 2003), which was held from 1 to 6 August 2022 at the Estadio Olímpico Pascual Guerrero in Cali, Colombia.
Cali previously hosted the 2015 World Youth Championships in Athletics.

Sports venues 

The main venue for the competitions was the Pascual Guerrero Olympic Stadium with capacity for 35,405 spectators, while the Pedro Grajales Athletics Stadium was used for training sessions.

Schedule

All dates are COT (UTC−5)

Qualifying Standards
Qualification period lasted from 1 October 2021 to 18 July 2022.

Men's results

Track events

Field events

Combined events

Women's results

Track events

* –

Field events

Combined events

Mixed results

Track

Medal table

Participation
The following is a list of participating nations with the number of qualified athletes in brackets. A country without any qualified athlete could enter either one male or one female. A total 145 National Associations and 1533 athletes are scheduled to compete.

References

External links
 Official Site

 
World U20 Championships
World Athletics U20 Championships
World Athletics U20 Championships
Sport in Cali
International athletics competitions hosted by Colombia
World Athletics U20 Championships
2022 World Athletics U20 Championships